Anderson Carlos Fabiano (born 24 March 1972), is a Brazilian professional forward.

Club career
Fabiano made seven appearances in the Russian First Division for FC Arsenal Tula during 1998.

References

1972 births
Living people
Brazilian footballers
Brazilian expatriate footballers
Footballers from Brasília
Pakhtakor Tashkent FK players
Uzbekistan Super League players
Brazilian expatriate sportspeople in Uzbekistan
Expatriate footballers in Uzbekistan
Expatriate footballers in Russia
Association football forwards
FC Arsenal Tula players